The Prospect House is a historic building located at 11 Hammond Street in Waltham, Massachusetts. Built in 1839, this temple-front Greek Revival structure was originally a hotel and tavern, and is one of only a few surviving 19th century hotel buildings in the city. Now an apartment house, the building has four two-story fluted Doric columns supporting a pedimented gable, with a second-story porch behind the columns. Early pedimented dormers have been linked together in later alterations.

The building was listed on the National Register of Historic Places in 1989.

See also
National Register of Historic Places listings in Waltham, Massachusetts

References

Houses on the National Register of Historic Places in Waltham, Massachusetts
Houses completed in 1839
Houses in Waltham, Massachusetts